The Australian Film Syndicate was a short lived Australian film production company based in North Sydney. According to novelist Arthur Wright, "A local draper put a lot of money into it, and lost it; though all the films produced were not 'duds.' One which paid its way well was an adaptation of my novel, Gamblers Gold."

It was associated with the Australian Film Company Limited. This went into liquidation in 1913.

Filmography
The Golden West (1911)
Gambler's Gold (1911)

References

Companies based in Sydney
Defunct companies of Australia
Film production companies of Australia